Retribution Gospel Choir is the eponymous debut album from the American musical group band Retribution Gospel Choir, led by Alan Sparhawk of the band Low. The album was released in the US on March 18, 2008, through Mark Kozelek's Caldo Verde Records. Kozelek also produced the album.

According to the Caldo Verde website, the album is a major shift from the slow, minimalist music of Low:

The first 1,000 copies pressed came with a 4 track bonus disc, titled RGC DUB, featuring untitled dub recordings. This version was only available through the Caldo Verde Records website link. The album was also pressed on limited edition vinyl in May 2008 and sold exclusively through Aural Exploits' website. The song "Breaker" first appeared on the Low album Drums and Guns in 2007 but was originally a Retribution Gospel Choir song.

Track listing
All songs written by Alan Sparhawk. 
 "They Knew You Well" - 3:41
 "Take Your Time" - 4:06
 "Breaker" - 2:06
 "Somebody's Someone" - 2:56
 "Destroyer" - 3:33
 "Holes in Our Heads" - 2:59
 "What She Turned Into" - 2:22
 "For Her Blood" - 2:10
 "Kids" - 4:06
 "Easy Prey" - 2:14

RGC DUB: bonus disc
 "(Untitled)" - 6:52
 "(Untitled)" - 6:42
 "(Untitled)" - 4:21
 "(Untitled)" - 12:48

Musicians
 Alan Sparhawk - vocals, guitar
 Eric Pollard - drums, vocals
 Matt Livingston - bass 
 Mimi Parker - vocals on "Breaker"

Label
Caldo Verde Records
Catalog#: 14064
Format: CD, Vinyl, Limited Edition

References

http://www.discogs.com/artist/Retribution+Gospel+Choir

2008 debut albums
Retribution Gospel Choir albums
Caldo Verde Records albums
Albums produced by Mark Kozelek